The Davis–Ercanbrack Farmstead was a farmstead on the southern edge of Orem, Utah, United States, that was previously listed on the National Register of Historic Places (NRHP).

Description
The former farmstead, located at 2044 South Main Street, was built in 1905. The core of the house dates from c.1870 but alterations since have been so considerable that no part clearly evokes that era. The historically significant period of the surviving property dates from 1905. Also, fruit was first grown on the property in 1905.

It was listed on the NRHP October 2, 1998. After the Legacy Ridge residential development was built on the site of the former farmstead, the property was delisted from the NRHP July 23, 2018.

See also

 National Register of Historic Places listings in Utah County, Utah

References

External links

 Davis/Ercanbrack Farmstead on JacobBarlow.com ~ Exploring with Jacob Barlow

Farms on the National Register of Historic Places in Utah
1870 establishments in Utah Territory
Houses in Orem, Utah
National Register of Historic Places in Orem, Utah
Former National Register of Historic Places in Utah